Bristoe Bryant (February 27, 19061986) was a Michigan politician.

Early life
Bryant was born on February 27, 1906, in Huntingdon, Tennessee.

Education
Bryant graduated from Cass Technical High School and attended Wayne State University.

Career
On April 2, 1951, Bryant was elected to the Michigan Senate where he represented the 2nd district from April 16, 1951, to 1952. Bryant was a candidate in the Democratic primary for the position of United States Representative from Michigan's 16th District.

Personal life
Bryant was a member of the Elks and was a Freemason. Bryant was an African Methodist Episcopal.

Death
Bryant died in 1986.

References

1906 births
1986 deaths
American Freemasons
Methodists from Michigan
People from Huntingdon, Tennessee
Cass Technical High School alumni
African-American state legislators in Michigan
Democratic Party Michigan state senators
20th-century American politicians
20th-century African-American people